Peter Amm (born 5 July 1962) is a South African cricketer. He played in one List A and nineteen first-class matches for Eastern Province from 1987/88 to 1990/91.

See also
 List of Eastern Province representative cricketers

References

External links
 

1962 births
Living people
South African cricketers
Eastern Province cricketers
People from Makana Local Municipality